Sideral is a 2021 Brazilian and French short film directed by Carlos Segundo. The fifteen-minute story shot in Black & White is a glimpse into the lives of a Brazilian family impacted by the extraordinary event of rocket launch from a nearby centre. The short has been presented in a number of festivals, including Cannes Film Festival and the Clermont-Ferrand Film Festival, Telluride Film Festival and won several awards, including the Oscar Qualifying award for Best International Short at the 2022 Palm Springs International Shorts Fest.

Plot 
In the coastal city of Natal, north-east of Brazil, the first ever rocket launch of the country is about to happen. As the spacecraft leaves the Earth, the lives of a family living nearby will be drastically impacted.

Reception 
Since its world premiere at the 2021 Cannes Film Festival, the film has been selected in various festivals and academies around the world:

References

External links 
 Official Trailer on Vimeo.
 Sideral at IMDb.

2021 films
2021 short films
Brazilian short films
French short films